Throughout history, spiders have been depicted in popular culture, mythology and in symbolism. From Greek mythology to African folklore, the spider has been used to represent a variety of things, and endures into the present day with characters such as Shelob from The Lord of the Rings and Spider-Man from the eponymous comic series. It is also a symbol of mischief and malice for its toxic venom and the slow death it causes, which is often seen as a curse. In addition, the spider has inspired creations from an ancient geoglyph to a modern steampunk spectacle. Spiders have been the focus of fears, stories and mythologies of various cultures for centuries.

The spider has symbolized patience and persistence due to its hunting technique of setting webs and waiting for its prey to become ensnared. Numerous cultures attribute the spider's ability to spin webs with the origin of spinning, textile weaving, basket weaving, knotwork and net making. Spiders are associated with creation myths because they seem to weave their own artistic worlds. Philosophers often use the spider's web as a metaphor or analogy, and today terms such as the Internet or World Wide Web evoke the inter-connectivity of a spider web.

In folklore and mythology
The spider, along with its web, is featured in mythological fables, cosmology, artistic spiritual depictions, and in oral traditions throughout the world since ancient times. The spider was syncretically associated with the goddess Neith of Ancient Egypt in her aspect as spinner and weaver of destiny, this link continuing later through the Babylonian Ishtar and the Greek Arachne, who was later equated as the Roman goddess Minerva.

Near East
Uttu, the ancient Sumerian goddess of weaving, was envisioned as a spider spinning her web. According to the myth of Enki and Ninsikila, she was the daughter of the water god Enki. After being warned by Enki's wife Ninhursag that he would attempt to seduce her, Uttu ensconced herself inside her web, but agreed to let Enki in after he promised to marry her and give her fresh produce as a marriage gift. After giving Uttu the produce, Enki intoxicated her with beer and raped her. Ninhursag heard Uttu's screams and rescued her, removing Enki's semen from her vagina and planting it in the ground to produce eight previously nonexistent plants.

An Islamic oral tradition holds that during the Hijra, the journey from Mecca to Medina, Muhammad and his companion Abu Bakr were being pursued by Quraysh soldiers, and they decided to take refuge in the Cave of Thawr. The tale goes on to say that Allah commanded a spider to weave a web across the opening of the cave. After seeing the spider's web, the Quraysh passed the cave by, since Muhammad's entry to the cave would have broken the web. Since then, it has been held in many Muslim traditions that a spider, if not holy, is at least to be respected. A similar story occurs in the Jewish tradition, where it is David who is being chased by King Saul. David hides in a cave, and Saul and his men do not bother to search the cave because, while David was hiding inside, a spider had spun a web over the mouth of the cave.

Ancient Greece and Rome
A notable ancient legend from the Western canon that explains the origin of the spider comes from the Greek story of the weaving competition between Athena the goddess, and Arachne, sometimes described as a princess. This story may have originated in Lydian mythology; but the myth, briefly mentioned by Virgil in 29 BC, is known from the later Greek mythos after Ovid wrote the poem Metamorphoses between the years AD 2 and 8. The Greek "arachne" (αράχνη) means "spider", and is the origin of Arachnida, the spiders' taxonomic class.

This myth tells of Arachne, the daughter of a famous Tyrian purple wool dyer in Hypaepa of Lydia. Due to her father's skill with cloth dyeing, Arachne became adept in the art of weaving. Eventually she began to consider herself to be a greater weaver than the goddess Athena herself, and challenged the goddess to a weaving contest to prove her superior skill. Athena wove the scene of her victory over Poseidon that had earned her the patronage of Athens, while Arachne wove a tapestry featuring many episodes of infidelity among the Gods of Olympus, which angered Athena. The goddess conceded that Arachne's weaving was flawless, but she was infuriated by the mortal's pride. In a final moment of anger, Athena destroyed Arachne's tapestry and loom with her shuttle and cursed Arachne to live with extreme guilt. Out of sadness, Arachne soon hanged herself. Taking pity on her, Athena brought her back to life transformed as a spider, using the poison aconite; "—and ever since, Arachne, as a spider, weaves her web."

The scholar Robert Graves proposed Ovid's tale may have its roots in the commercial rivalry between the Athenian citizenry of Greece and that of Miletus in Asia Minor, which flourished around 2000 BC. In Miletus, the spider may have been an important figure; seals with spider emblems have been recovered there.

Africa
In African mythology, the spider is personified as a trickster character in African traditional folklore. The most popular version of the West African spider trickster is Kwaku Ananse of the Ashanti, anglicized as Aunt Nancy (or Sister Nancy) in the West Indies and some other parts of the Americas, to name a few of many incarnations.
Stories of Ananse became such a prominent and familiar part of Ashanti oral culture that the word Anansesem—"spider tales"—came to embrace all kinds of fables. This fed into the Anansi toree or "spider tales"; stories that were brought over from Africa and told to children of Maroon people and other Africans in the diaspora. These tales are allegorical stories that often also teach a moral lesson. Major A.J.N. Tremearne observed that the Hausa also view the spider with high esteem as the most cunning of all animals and the king of all stories, even employing similar narrative storytelling devices of the Akan-Ashanti by attributing each of them to the spider, identified as Gizzo or Gizo in their indigenous language. Author Neil Gaiman also popularised the spider god Anansi in his book, Anansi Boys, where the protagonist learns that the trickster god was his father.

Americas

North American cultures have traditionally depicted spiders. The Native American Lakota people's oral tradition also includes a spider-trickster figure, which is known by several names. As chronicled in the legend of The "Wasna" (Pemmican) Man and the Unktomi (Spider), a man encounters a hungry spider family, and the hero Stone Boy is tricked out of his fancy clothes by Unktomi, a trickster spider figure. In some Native American myths, the spider is also seen in the legend about the origin of the constellation Ursa Major. The constellation was seen as seven men transformed into stars and climbing to paradise by unrolling a spider's web. The Hopi have the creation myth of Spider Grandmother. In this story, Spider Grandmother thought the world into existence through the conscious weaving of her webs. Spider Grandmother also plays an important role in the creation mythology of the Navajo, and there are stories relating to Spider Woman in the heritage of many Southwestern native cultures as a powerful helper and teacher. In Mesoamerica, the Great Goddess of Teotihuacan may represent a similar figure.

The South American Moche people of ancient Peru worshiped nature; they placed emphasis on animals and often depicted spiders in their art. The people of the Nazca culture created expansive geoglyphs, including a large depiction of a spider on the Nazca plain in southern Peru. The purpose or meaning of the so-called "Nazca lines" is still uncertain. An adobe spider-god temple of the Cupisnique culture was discovered in the Lambayeque Region of Peru. It is part of the Ventarron temple complex and is known as Collud. The Cupisnique spider deity was associated with hunting nets, textiles, war, and power. One image depicts spider deities holding nets filled with decapitated human heads.

Oceania
Spiders are depicted in Indigenous Australian art, in rock and bark paintings, and for clan totems. Spiders in their webs are associated with a sacred rock in central Arnhem Land on the Burnungku clan estate of the Rembarrnga/Kyne people. Their totem design is connected with a major regional ceremony, providing a connection with neighboring clans that also have spider totems in their rituals. Nareau, the Lord Spider, created the universe, according to the traditional Cosmology of Oceania's Kiribati islanders of the Tungaru archipelago (Gilbert Islands); similarly, Areop-Enap ("Old Spider") plays an important part in the creation myth of the traditional Nauru islanders of Micronesia.

Asia

The Tsuchigumo (translated as "Earth spiders") of Japan, is a mythical, supernatural creature faced by the legendary Minamoto no Raiko. Depending on the version of the story, the Tsuchigumo was able to take the visage of either a boy or a woman. In one version, while on a search for a mythical giant skull, Raiko is lured to a dilapidated house using an illusion of a floating skull. Raiko and his companion Watanabe no Tsuna killed the Tsuchigumo at the end of the story, releasing spiders the size of children from its belly.

Another Japanese mythological spider figure is the Jorōgumo ("prostitute spider") which is portrayed as being able to transform into a seductive woman. In some instances, the Jorōgumo attempts to seduce and perhaps marry passing samurai. In other instances she is venerated as a goddess dwelling in the Jōren Falls who saves people from drowning. Her name also refers to a golden orb-spider species Trichonephila clavata (Jorō-gumo, which translates to "binding bride" or "whore spider").

In the Philippines, there is a Visayan folk tale version of The Spider and the Fly which explains why the spider hates the fly.

Post-classical Europe
The 10th-century Saint Conrad of Constance is sometimes represented as a bishop holding a chalice with a spider. According to this story, while he was celebrating Easter Mass, a spider fell into the chalice. Ignoring the commonly held belief of the time that all or most spiders were poisonous, as a token of faith, Conrad nevertheless drank the wine with the spider in it.

For King Robert the Bruce of Scotland, the spider is depicted as an inspirational symbol, according to an early 14th-century legend. The legend tells of Robert the Bruce's encounter with a spider during the time of a series of military failures against the English. One version tells that while taking refuge in a cave on Rathlin Island, he witnesses a spider continuously failing to climb its silken thread to its web. However, due to perseverance the spider eventually succeeds, demonstrating that "if at first you don't succeed, try, try and try again". Taking this as being symbolic of hope and perseverance, Bruce came out of hiding and eventually won Scotland's independence.

In Polish folklore and literature, Pan Twardowski - a sorcerer who made a deal with the Devil - is depicted as having escaped from the Devil who was taking him to Hell, and ending up living on the Moon, his only companion being a spider; from time to time Twardowski lets the spider descend to Earth on a thread and bring him news and gossip from the world below.

In philosophy

In the Vedic philosophy of India, the spider is depicted as hiding the ultimate reality with the veils of illusion. Indra's net is used as a metaphor for the Buddhist concept of interpenetration, which holds that all phenomena are intimately connected. Indra's net has a multifaceted jewel at each vertex, and each jewel is reflected in all of the other jewels.

As related in the book Vermeer's Hat by historian Timothy Brook:

In literature
The epic poem Metamorphoses, written by Ovid two millennia ago, includes the metamorphosis of Arachne. This was retold in Dante Alighieri's depiction as the half-spider Arachne in the second book of his Divine Comedy, Purgatorio.

Considered as the earliest known work of science fiction in Western literature, the 2nd-century satirical novel A True Story by Lucian of Samosata includes a battle between the People of the Moon and the People of the Earth featuring giant spiders that are bigger than the islands of Cyclades.

In the 15th century, the French king Louis XI acquired the nickname "the universal spider" (l'universelle aragne), from Georges Chastellain, a chronicler of the dukes of Burgundy, referring to the king's tendency to implement schemes and plans during his contention with Burgundy and the following conflicts with Charles the Bold who compared the king to a spider.

In the 16th-century Chinese folk novel, Wu Cheng'en's Journey to the West, the Buddhist monk Tang Sanzang's odyssey includes being trapped in a spider's cave and bound by beautiful women and many children, who are transformations of spiders.

Published in 1808, the poem Marmion by Walter Scott includes the popularly quoted line:

The spider gained an evil reputation from the 1842 Biedermeier novella by Jeremias Gotthelf, The Black Spider. In this allegorical tale that was adapted to various media, the spider symbolizes evil works and represents the moral consequences of making a pact with the devil.

Atlach-Nacha is the creation of Clark Ashton Smith and first appeared in his short story "The Seven Geases" (1934). Atlach-Nacha resembles a huge spider with an almost-human face. In the story, Atlach-Nacha is the reluctant recipient of a human sacrifice given to it by the toad-god Tsathoggua.

Spiders serve as a recurring motif in the works of J. R. R. Tolkien. Tolkien included giant spiders in his 1937 book The Hobbit where they roamed Mirkwood, attacking and sometimes capturing the main characters. The character of Ungoliant is featured as a spiderlike entity, and as a personification of Night from his earliest writings. In The Lord of the Rings, the creature's final surviving daughter Shelob is encountered as Frodo and Sam move through the mountain pass of Cirith Ungol. Shelob was featured in the film adaption of the last book of the Lord of the Rings series. Although described as giant spiders, Tolkien gave them fictional attributes such as compound eyes, beaks and the spinning of black webs. He also resurrected the Old English words cob and lob for "spider".

A key element of Richard Matheson's novel The Shrinking Man and the film based on it The Incredible Shrinking Man is the struggle of the protagonist, shrunken to the size of an insect, with a voracious spider - ending with his waging an epic battle and killing the spider.

The 1952 children's novel Charlotte's Web by E. B. White is notable in its portrayal of the spider in a positive manner as a heroine rather than an object of fear or horror.

More recently, giant spiders have featured in books such as the 1998 fantasy novel Harry Potter and the Chamber of Secrets by J. K. Rowling. This book was later followed by a motion picture of the same name, using the giant spider Aragog from the novel as a supporting character and friend of groundskeeper, Hagrid. In Fantastic Beasts and Where to Find Them, a book about many of the creatures within the Wizarding World, these giant spiders are also known as Acromantulas.

The spider is also found in modern children's tales. The nursery rhymes "Itsy Bitsy Spider" and "Little Miss Muffet" have spiders as focal characters. The poem "The Spider and the Fly" (1829) by Mary Howitt is a cautionary tale of seduction and betrayal which later inspired a 1949 film and a 1965 Rolling Stones song, each sharing the same title, as well as a 1923 cartoon by Aesop Fables Studio.

The poet Walt Whitman describes a ballooning spider in his 1868 poem, A Noiseless Patient Spider.

In comics and manga

In graphic novels, spiders are often adapted by superheroes or villains as their symbols or alter egos due to the arachnid's strengths and weaknesses. One of the most notable characters in comic book history has taken his identity from the spider, the Marvel comic book hero Spider-Man. Peter Parker was accidentally bitten by a radioactive spider and then, as Spider-Man, was able to scale tall buildings and shoot web fluid from a device attached to his wrist. Along with these abilities came super senses and instant reflexes. Writer Stan Lee and artist Steve Ditko originated this franchise. Due to the character's popularity, Spider-Man appeared in movies and various other media. In addition to Spider-Man, the Marvel Universe includes several subsequent characters using the spider as their patron; including Silk, Spider-Woman, Spider-Girl, the Scarlet Spider, Venom, Araña, the Black Widow, and the Tarantula. The DC Comics universe also include characters named Spider Girl and the Tarantula.

Many other comic book, manga and anime characters have taken the guise of a spider, such as the Black Spider from the Batman universe; in the Pokémon franchise, Spinarak and Ariados, Joltik and Galvantula, and Dewpider and Araquanid, are all variously based on spiders. In the Static Shock series, the titular character meets another superhero called Anansi the Spider in Africa. He takes his name from the African trickster god.

The light novel and manga series So I'm a Spider, So What?, the protagonist is turned into a spider at the beginning of the story. Trapped in a world based around Japanese role-playing game tropes, she makes use of webs, various types of traps and poison attacks, and her intellect to survive.

In film and television
Spiders have been present for many decades both in film and on television, predominantly in the horror genre. Those who suffer from arachnophobia, an acute fear of spiders, become particularly horrified. The spider web is used as a motif to adorn dark passageways, depicting the recesses of the unknown.

Spider themes are featured in early film history. In Fritz Lang's 1919 and 1920 The Spiders adventure series, a spider is the calling card for "The Spiders" criminal organization. Pan Si Dong (1927), 盘丝洞, (The Cave of the Silken Web) is a film adaptation of the classic tale of Xuánzàng's encounter from a chapter of the 16th-century Great Classical Novel, Journey to the West, and was remade as a 1967 Hong Kong cinema production.

Many horror films have featured the spider, including 1955's Tarantula!, exploiting America's fear of atomic radiation during the nuclear arms race, the 1975 low-budget cult film The Giant Spider Invasion, and Kingdom of the Spiders, a 1977 film starring William Shatner as a veterinarian who found himself facing a horde of spiders hiding in Verde Valley, Arizona.

The fear of spiders culminates in Arachnophobia, a 1990 movie in which spiders multiply in large numbers. On the other hand, a person who admires spiders is referred to as an "arachnophile"; such as Virginia, a demented orphan who likes to play deadly spider games in the black comedy horror B movie, Spider Baby.

The Godzilla franchise includes a giant spiderlike kaiju named Kumonga ("Spiga" in the English versions), first appearing in 1967's Son of Godzilla. The 1999 film Wild Wild West features a giant mechanical spider. Experiments with spiders in space tend to go horribly wrong, as with a DNA experiment on board a NASA space shuttle in the 2000 film Spiders, or mutant spiders from a derelict Soviet space station in the 2013 film Spiders 3D. Before there were Snakes on a Plane (2006), there were spiders on a plane in Tarantulas: The Deadly Cargo (1977). Radiation and spiders once again combine to wreak havoc in the 2002 film spoof Eight Legged Freaks, this time due to nuclear waste.

Several books featuring spiders have been adapted to film, including The Lord of the Rings: The Return of the King featuring Shelob and Harry Potter and the Chamber of Secrets with Aragog the Acromantula. Charlotte A. Cavatica's positive portrayal of a spider character can be seen in two full-length feature versions of Charlotte's Web. The first Charlotte's Web was a Hanna-Barbera musical animated film released in 1973, followed by a live-action 2006 film version of the original story. Walt Disney Pictures produced the 1996 film James and the Giant Peach based on the 1961 novel of the same name by Roald Dahl, in which the abused orphan James, who is only friends with a spider, finds more insect friends such as Spider and Centipede after entering a magical peach.

In Ingmar Bergman's 1961 Swedish film adaptation Through a Glass Darkly, the psychotic Karin believes she has an encounter with God as a spider. Surreal spider imagery symbolism and themes are featured prominently in the 2013 psychological thriller Enemy; director Denis Villeneuve's film adaptation of the novel The Double by José Saramago.

On television, the 1990 miniseries Stephen King's It is based on his novel It, where the now adult members of the Losers' club confront the giant spider form of Pennywise the Dancing Clown. The plot of the 2018 Doctor Who episode "Arachnids in the UK" revolves around an infestation of giant spiders that has occurred as the result of a scientific experiment.

In music
The Rolling Stones adapted themes from Mary Howitt's poem in their 1965 song "The Spider and the Fly". Released in 1966, "Boris the Spider" was the first song written by John Entwistle for The Who, and became a staple of their live concerts. "Spiderwebs" became a hit for No Doubt in 1995. Alice Cooper's 2008 concept album, Along Came a Spider is about a fictitious serial killer known as 'Spider', who wraps his victims in silk and cuts off one of their legs in order to create his own eight-legged arachnoid.

Other depictions

Information technology terms such as the "web spider" (or "web crawler") and the World Wide Web imply the spiderlike connection of information accessed on the Internet.

A dance, the tarantella, refers to the purported victims of a bite from the spider Lycosa tarantula which were allegedly compelled to dance until they were exhausted.

Giant spider sculptures (11 feet tall and 22 feet across) described as "looming and powerful protectresses, yet are nurturing, delicate, and vulnerable" and a "favorite with children" have been found in Washington DC, Denver CO, and elsewhere. Even larger sculptures are found in places like Ottawa and Zürich. These sculptures, two series of six by Louise Bourgeois, can be seen at the National Gallery of Art, Denver Art Museum, London's Tate Modern and in a few other select sculpture gardens. The larger series is titled Maman and the other simply titled Spider. One Spider was sold at a Christie's auction house for over $10 million.

A four-day performance art spectacle in Liverpool (September 2008) featured La Princesse by the French performance art company La Machine. This giant steampunk spider climbed walls, stalked the streets and sprayed unwary citizens while in search of a nest.

Games and toys
Giant spiders appear in several role-playing games, such as Lolth, the Spider Queen of Dungeons & Dragons, and the first edition of Warcraft, where spiders are described as being "of staggering size—perhaps 15 feet around—with great furred body." In video games, spiders or spider-shaped foes are common, such as the Metroid series where the trilogy's antagonist, Metroid Prime, has a spiderlike Metroid as her primary physical form. This trilogy also includes the Ing, antagonists of Echoes, whose warrior forms resemble five-legged spiders. Atlach-Nacha is an H-game centered on a spiderlike demoness disguising herself as a human. In The Legend of Zelda series, giant spiders are a frequent foe. In particular, Ocarina of Time features large spiders named Skulltulas, and Twilight Princess has an enormous spider boss. Monster Hunter 4 introduced monster a called the Nerscylla, described in game as a "Temnoceran," based on the Chelicerate subphylum of arthropods, along with its subspecies, the Shrouded Nerscylla. An anthropomorphic spiderlike creature based on Little Miss Muffet named Muffet is featured in the 2015 video game Undertale. Giant spiders appear as hostile enemies in The Elder Scrolls V: Skyrim which were quickly modded into bears by the players.

In the Lego toyline Bionicle series, the Visorak horde is a species consisting of six spiderlike breeds. They are created by the Brotherhood of Makuta to conquer islands; they possess mutagenic venom and spin sticky green webs. In the Transformers franchise, Tarantulas and Blackarachnia are both Predacons that turn into giant spiders.

Sports
Notable athletes with spider nicknames include Olympic skier Spider Sabich, so named by his father due to his long, thin arms and legs as a baby,
and UFC Middleweight Champion Anderson "The Spider" Silva who was dubbed "Brazil's Spiderman" by an announcer who thought he looked like a superhero in the ring. Spider mascots are associated with the Cleveland Spiders baseball team and the San Francisco Spiders hockey team, as well as the University of Richmond's athletic teams.

Modern myths and urban legends 
The widespread urban legend that a person swallows a high number of spiders during sleep in one's life has no basis in reality. A sleeping person causes all kinds of noise and vibrations by breathing, snoring, their heartbeat, etc., all of which warn spiders of danger.

Huntsman spiders are large and swift, often eliciting arachnophobic reactions from susceptible people, and are the subject of many superstitions, exaggerations and myths. The banana spider myth claims that the Huntsman spider lays its eggs in banana flower blossoms, resulting in spiders inside the tip of bananas, waiting to terrorize an unsuspecting consumer. This is supposed to explain why monkeys allegedly peel bananas from the "wrong" end.

According to another urban legend, daddy long legs (Pholcidae) have potent venom, but their fangs are too short to deliver the poison. This myth might have arisen due to its similarity in appearance with the Brown recluse spider. In a 2004 episode of Discovery Channel's MythBusters, it was shown that host Adam Savage baits and survives a bite from a daddy long legs.

A modern myth depicts a young woman who discovered that her beehive hairdo was infested with Black widow spiders.

The Spider Bite legend emerged in Europe in the late 1970s. In most versions of this tale, a young vacationing female sunbather is bitten on the cheek by a spider. After seeking medical attention for the resultant swelling, hundreds of tiny spiders are discovered emerging from her lanced wound, which causes the victim to go insane.

An email hoax describes the attacks by the South American Blush Spider in public toilets. The alleged spider's scientific name is Arachnius gluteus, where "arachnius" is a made-up word intended to mean "spider" and "gluteus" is a reference to buttocks (cf: gluteus maximus). The hoax spider shares some characteristics with the two-striped telamonia (Telamonia dimidiata), and there is an updated version of the hoax using that name for the spider's species, with the rest of the text left unchanged, except for details such as locations. This hoax began in 1999 and has since spread to social media where it continues to circulate.

See also
Arthropods in culture
Cobweb painting
Dreamcatcher — Native American cultural object, styled after a spider's web
Earth vs. the Spider — 1958 science-fiction/horror film
2001 film, an homage to the original
Las Hilanderas  (Velázquez) — Baroque painting, c. 1657; (a.k.a. The Fable of Arachne)
"The Spider's Thread" — 1918 short story by Ryūnosuke Akutagawa
"Legend of the Christmas Spider" — Eastern European folk tale
"The Redback on the Toilet Seat" — Australian country music novelty song by Slim Newton

Notes

References

Further reading

External links

Spiders in popular culture
 
Textiles in folklore
Cultural depictions of animals